The Keokuk Junction Railway Co. , is a Class III railroad in the U.S. states of Illinois and Iowa.  It is a subsidiary of Pioneer Railcorp.

History

The present company was incorporated in 1980 as the Keokuk Northern Real Estate Co., formed in May 1980 to purchase  of the Chicago, Rock Island & Pacific Railroad yard track in Keokuk, Iowa.  The KJRY obtained that trackage in 1981.  In December 1986, the KJRY bought, from the Santa Fe Railway,  of trackage consisting of the LaHarpe line and Warsaw line from Keokuk/Warsaw, Illinois to LaHarpe, Illinois, formerly owned by the Toledo, Peoria and Western.

Pioneer Railcorp filed with the Surface Transportation Board to acquire 66.62% of KNRECO, Inc. (the KJRY) from majority shareholder John Warfield, and purchased KNRECO in March 1996.

Brookhaven Rail Partners acquired Pioneer Rail corporation on July 31, 2019.

Connections
 Burlington Northern Santa Fe Railroad — Keokuk, Iowa, Bushnell, Illinois, and Peoria, Illinois
 Canadian National Railway — Peoria, Illinois
 Illinois and Midland Railroad — Peoria, Illinois
 Iowa Interstate Railroad — Peoria, Illinois
 Norfolk Southern Railroad — Peoria, Illinois
 Pioneer Industrial Railway — Peoria, Illinois 
 Tazewell and Peoria Railroad — Peoria, Illinois
 Toledo, Peoria and Western Railway — Hollis, Illinois
 Union Pacific Railroad — Fort Madison, Iowa and Peoria, Illinois

References

External links

 
 A Tribute to the Keokuk Junction Railway — information about the KJRY prior to 1996 purchase

Illinois railroads
Iowa railroads
Keokuk, Iowa
Pioneer Lines
Spin-offs of the Chicago, Rock Island and Pacific Railroad
Switching and terminal railroads